President Lyndon B. Johnson created the Commission on April 2, 1964, with .

Purpose
Officially known as the "Federal Reconstruction and Development Planning Commission for Alaska", it served as coordinator for existing federal programs' relief  efforts in Alaska following the 1964 Alaska earthquake of March 27, 1964, which measured 9.2 on the moment magnitude scale (the largest by magnitude to hit American territory).

Specifically, the Commission
Cooperated with Alaskan state representatives in creating surveys and scientific studies to determine what short-range and long-range government actions were needed
Created and maintained field committees to carry out this work
Planned federal programs in Alaska focusing on reconstruction, economic issues, and development of natural resources
Recommended ways to carry out these proposed federal programs
Reported its work to Congress

Members
Senator Clinton Anderson (D-NM), Chair
Robert S. McNamara, Secretary of Defense
Stewart L. Udall, Secretary of the Interior
Orville L. Freeman, Secretary of Agriculture
Luther H. Hodges, Secretary of Commerce
W. Willard Wirtz, Secretary of Labor
Anthony J. Celebrezze, Secretary of Health, Education, and Welfare
Edward A. McDermott, Director, Office of Emergency Planning
Najeeb E. Halaby, Administrator, Federal Aviation Agency
Joseph C. Swidler, chair, Federal Power Commission
Robert C. Weaver, Administrator, Housing and Home Finance Agency
Eugene P. Foley, Administrator, Small Business Administration
Dwight A. Ink, Executive Director
Frank C. Di Luzio, Asst. to the Chair

Accomplishments
The Commission recommended that Congress allocate large amounts of additional federal funds for needed reconstruction programs in Alaska. The resulting public law
made $15,000,000 available for highway repair or reconstruction
extended or forgave housing loans made through the Farmer's Home Administration
made $25,000,000 available for urban renewal projects
extended the term of home disaster loans made through the Small Business Administration to 30 years
made $10,000,000 available for the Corps of Engineers to modify previously authorized civil works projects
made $25,000,000 available to the Housing and Home Finance Administration to purchase Alaskan state bonds for capital improvements
made $5,5000,000 available as matching funds enabling the state of Alaska to retire or adjust home mortgage loans.

Publications
Response to Disaster: Report of the Federal Reconstruction and Development Planning Commission for Alaska (1964) http://hdl.handle.net/2027/mdp.39015046907385

References

History of the government of the United States
United States Presidential Commissions
Presidency of Lyndon B. Johnson
1964 in Alaska
1964 natural disasters in the United States